Wheler is a surname, and may refer to:

 Humphrey Wheler (fl. 1600), English landowner and politician
 Sir William Wheler, 1st Baronet (c. 1601–1666), English politician
 Francis Wheler (1656–1694), Royal Navy officer
 George Wheler (mill owner) (1836–1908), Canadian mill owner and political figure
 George Wheler (travel writer) (1651–1724), English clergyman and travel writer
 Granville Wheler (1701–1770), English clergyman and natural philosopher

See also
Wheler baronets
Wheeler (disambiguation)